Youngberg may refer to:

People
 Brett Youngberg (born 1979), Canadian volleyball player
 Garth Youngberg, founder and director of the Institute for Alternative Agriculture
 Jordan Youngberg, American politician and businessman, member of the South Dakota Senate from 2017 to 2020
 Renae Youngberg (1933–2015), American baseball player in the All-American Girls Professional Baseball League

Other uses
 Youngberg, Arizona, United States, a populated place
 Youngberg v. Romeo, a landmark United States Supreme Court case regarding the rights of the involuntarily committed and mentally retarded